Purab Aur Pachhim is a 1970 Indian Hindi-language drama film. The movie was produced and directed by Manoj Kumar, and it stars Manoj Kumar, Saira Banu, Ashok Kumar, Pran and Prem Chopra in the lead roles. The music is by Kalyanji Anandji. The 2007 film Namastey London is inspired from this film. This was the second film by Manoj Kumar where he stars as Bharat (first being Upkar) and one of his four films on patriotism (Shaheed was his first, to be followed by Roti Kapda Aur Makaan and Kranti.)

Synopsis 
In 1942, British India, Harnam (Pran) betrays a freedom fighter, and as a result is rewarded, but the freedom fighter is killed, leaving his wife, Ganga (Kamini Kaushal) and family devastated and destitute. Years later, after the Indian Independence in 1947, the freedom fighter's son, Bharat (Manoj Kumar), has grown up and goes to London for higher studies. On his arrival in Britain, He meets his father's college friend, Sharma (Madan Puri) with his westernized wife, Rita (Shammi) and daughter, Preeti (Saira Banu) and the hippie son, Shankar (Rajendra Nath).
Preeti has long blonde hair, wears mini-dresses, smokes and drinks and has no idea of Indian values till she meets Bharat. He is, of course, shocked to see that many Indians in London are ashamed of their roots and even changed their names to sound western. Or others who long for their country, but stay in the UK for financial reasons, like Sharma with his stack of K. L. Saigal records. He takes it upon himself to try and change their way of thinking, while both Bharat and Preeti fall in love with each other. Later on, with his mother's and Guruji (Ashok Kumar)'s approval, he promised to marry Preeti.
 
Preeti is impressed by Bharat's idealism and wants to marry him, but doesn't want to live in India. Bharat wants her to come to India and see what it's like before she rejects it. The purity of India redeems her and she gives up smoking, drinking and minis to adopt the traditional lifestyle.

Cast 

 Manoj Kumar as Bharat
 Saira Banu as Preeti Sharma 
 Ashok Kumar as Guruji
 Kamini Kaushal as Ganga, Bharat's Mother
 Pran as Harnam
 Prem Chopra as Omkar/OP
 Nirupa Roy as Kaushalya, Harnam's wife
 Vinod Khanna as Shyamu
 Bharathi Vishnuvardhan as Gopi
 Madan Puri as Sharma
 Shammi as Rita Sharma, Sharma's wife
 Rajendra Nath as Shankar Sharma, Preeti's brother
 Om Prakash as Baba
 Manmohan as Manmohan

Release

Box office 
In India, the film grossed . This made it the fourth highest-grossing film of 1970 at the Indian box office.

Overseas in the United Kingdom, the film was released in 1971 and ran for over 50 weeks in London. It broke the UK box office record of Do Raaste, which had released in the UK a year earlier in 1970. Purab Aur Paschim held the UK record for 23 years up until Hum Aapke Hain Kaun (1994).

In total, the film grossed an estimated  in India and the United Kingdom.

Reception 

Purab aur Pachhim received generally positive reviews. Deepa Gahlot of Bollywood Hungama wrote: "By linking the story to the freedom struggle, Manoj Kumar was saying that freeing India from British rule is not enough if Indians do not feel proud of their Indianness. Manoj Kumar shot in London at the height of the "hippie" phase and caught both the beauty and ugliness of the English landscape. However, his simplistic view of the West was greed, lust and depravity, while India stood for love, honour and piety. Amazingly, the idea has endured, and in even in Aditya Chopra's cult hit Dilwale Dulhania Le Jayenge, Indian boy (Shah Rukh Khan) does not touch the Indian girl (Kajol), though he claims a chain of foreign girlfriends, and neither does he want to marry her without her father's consent. Then as now, Indian culture is represented with a lot of colour, rituals, song and dance. In Namastey London (2007), Akshay Kumar sells the same version of India to the London girl (Katrina Kaif) -- and a line in the film pays tribute to the original, when he tells her that if her boyfriend's uncle and their associates want to learn more about India, he'd give her a DVD of Purab Aur Pachhim which she should give to them."

Soundtrack 
The music of the film was composed by
Kalyanji–Anandji and lyrics by Indivar, Prem Dhawan and Santosh Anand.

References

External links 
 

1970 films
1970s Hindi-language films
Films scored by Kalyanji Anandji
Films directed by Manoj Kumar